Merrills Branch is a stream in Marion and Shelby Counties in the U.S. state of Missouri. It is a tributary of the North River.

Merrills Branch has the name of an early settler.

See also
List of rivers of Missouri

References

Rivers of Marion County, Missouri
Rivers of Shelby County, Missouri
Rivers of Missouri